The 2013 season was Washington Spirit's first season of existence in which they competed in the National Women's Soccer League, the top division of women's soccer in the United States.

Review
The inaugural Spirit roster began to assemble on January 11, 2013 as part of the NWSL Player Allocation, goalkeeper Ashlyn Harris (USA), defender Ali Krieger (USA), midfielder Lori Lindsey (USA), defender Robyn Gayle (CAN), midfielder Diana Matheson (CAN), defender Alina Garciamendez (MEX) and midfielder Teresa Worbis (MEX) were named to the team. During the February 7, 2013 NWSL Supplemental Draft, the team selected Stephanie Ochs, Tori Huster, Jordan Angeli, Natasha Kai, Megan Mischler and Heather Cooke.

The Spirit played their first competitive match on April 14, 2013, drawing Boston Breakers 1–1 with Tiffany McCarty scoring the team's first goal assisted by Stephanie Ochs. The Spirit won their first competitive match on May 16, 2013, when they defeated the Seattle Reign 2-4 at Starfire Stadium. As the season wore on, the Spirit struggled to gain form and after the first eleven matches, Mike Jorden was fired and replaced by Mark Parsons.

The coaching transition would be tough, and the Spirit continued the season with a 13-match winless streak (only one draw) until finishing the season on a high with two wins and a draw. Washington finished their first season in last place (8th).

Club

Roster 

 (FP)

 (FP)
 (FP)
 (FP)

 (FP)

 (FP)

Team management

Competitions

Preseason

Regular season

Standings

Results summary

Statistics

Appearances and goals 

|}

Top scorers
Players with one goal or more included only.

Top assists 
Players with one assist or more included only.

Disciplinary record

Disciplinary record 
Players with 1 card or more included only.

Goalkeeper stats 
Last updated: August 20, 2013

Transfers

In

Loan in

Honors and awards

NWSL Yearly Awards

NWSL Team of the Year

See also 
 2013 National Women's Soccer League season

References 

Washington Spirit seasons
Washington Spirit
Washington Spirit
Washington Spirit